Muqabla is 1979 Hindi-language action film directed by Rajkumar Kohli. The film stars Sunil Dutt, Shatrughan Sinha, Reena Roy, Bindiya Goswami in lead roles. Rajesh Khanna, Rekha appear in special appearances in a qawwali song. The film was average in box office terms. The song Govinda Govinda remains popular and even today is played on the festival of Janmmashtami in India.

Cast 
 Sunil Dutt as Vinod / Vikram "Vicky"
 Shatrughan Sinha as Chhaganlal "Chheno"
 Reena Roy as Lachho
 Bindiya Goswami as Champa
 Rajesh Khanna as Qawwali Singer (Special Appearance)
 Rekha as Qawwali Singer (Special Appearance)
 Premnath as Police Inspector
 Madan Puri as Heeralal
 Ranjeet as Keemtilal / Banwarilal

Soundtrack
All music was composed by Laxmikant–Pyarelal. Lyrics were by Verma Malik.

References

External links 
 

1979 films
1970s Hindi-language films
Indian action films
Fictional portrayals of the Maharashtra Police
Films scored by Laxmikant–Pyarelal
1979 action films